Wilcox Lake is a lake located west of Bakertown, New York. It is the largest body of water in Wilcox Lake Wild Forest. Fish species present in the lake are brook trout, white sucker, and brown bullhead. Several primitive campsites, which are only accessible via hiking trails, surround the lake. There is carry down access via trails used as snowmobile trails in the winter.

References

Lakes of New York (state)
Lakes of Warren County, New York